Jessi Frey is the vocalist, and together with O.D. the founder, of the industrial/metal/electronic band Velcra. Her singing style ranges from very aggressive and rough rap metal vocals (heard on Velcra's first two albums) to melodic, emotional expression (especially on the band's third album).
She is now currently a product manager at Nokia.

On 9 February 2019 Jessi released the debut single from her new album, Villainess.

External links
Velcra homepage

Year of birth missing (living people)
Living people
Women heavy metal singers
21st-century Finnish women singers
Finnish heavy metal singers